Crystal is the name of two locations in Nevada:

Crystal, Clark County, Nevada
Crystal, Nye County, Nevada

ar:كريستال، نيفادا
vo:Crystal (Nevada)